Mimodoxa is a genus of moths in the family Cosmopterigidae.

Species
Mimodoxa dryina Lower, 1901
Mimodoxa empyrophanes Turner, 1932
Mimodoxa loxospila Turner, 1932
Mimodoxa metallica (Lower, 1899)
Mimodoxa phaulophanes Turner, 1932
Mimodoxa tricommatica Turner, 1932

References
Natural History Museum Lepidoptera genus database

Cosmopteriginae